TV JOJ is a Slovak private TV channel owned by J&T Enterprises and launched in March 2002. The channel screens serial dramas and TV shows.

History
It was launched on 2 March 2002 as a successor of the TV Global, which had been broadcasting since March 2000. The station's first slogan was "Nuda na Slovensku skončila" - "Boredom in Slovakia has finished". TV JOJ was built by former head of the Czech channel TV Nova, Vladimír Železný, when he was at war with TV Nova's U.S. investor Central European Media Enterprises (CME). Through Joj, Železný wanted to shake the dominance of CME's station in Slovakia, TV Markíza, which was enjoying almost 50 percent of the country's nationwide audience. In its first years on the market, TV Joj failed. Surviving through airing an anemic TV Nova diet, the station was beaten in ratings by TV Nova itself, whose strong signal reached deep into Slovakia. Still, many are reported to have decided to stay anyway.

In 2004, when CME bought back TV Nova, the Americans had to divest from TV Joj as Slovak legislation forbids a company to own two nationwide TV stations. The Czechs sold TV Joj back to Grafobal. As of 2004, TV Joj somewhat improved its audience and increased its reach from 65 percent of the country to 80 percent in 2005. Behind Grafobal is the Slovak businessman Ivan Kmotrík. His empire encompasses the country's largest newspaper distributor and retailer Mediaprint & Kapa Pressegrosso, four large printing houses and the advertising agency EURO RSCG Artmedia, among others.

J&T Media Enterprises, a J&T vehicle, bought Mac TV, the holder of the license for TV Joj, from Grafobal Group in January 2007. At the same time, from J&T Finance Group, Grafobal Group received the all-news TV station TA3, becoming the full owner of CEN, the company operating TA3.

Markíza can no longer compete with TV JOJ. TV JOJ has toughen up their primetime and their average weekly audience share has increased to 21,8 % as of July 2, 2012. Markíza's weekly audience share is 26,7 % nowadays. TV Markíza has recorded a massive decrease of audience share. Back to 2007 they had average weekly audience share up to 39,7%.

Programming

Reality shows

American TV shows

Local TV dramas

Animated TV shows 
 Bolek and Lolek (Bolek a Lolek) 
 DuckTales (Káčerovo)
 Inspector Gadget (Inšpektor Gadget) 
 Chip 'n Dale: Rescue Rangers (Rýchla rota Chipa a Dala)
 Shaun the Sheep (Shaun ovce)
 My Little Pony: Friendship is Magic (Môj malý pony: Priateľstvo je magické)
 Bob the Builder (Staviteľ Bob)
 Gravity Falls (Mestečko záhad)
 Ferdy The Ant (Ferdo Mravec)
 Pokémon
 Star Wars Rebels (Star Wars Rebeli)
 The Lion Guard (Levia hliadka)
 SpongeBob SquarePants (SpongeBob v nohaviciach)
 PAW Patrol (Labková patrola)

Former telenovas
 Por Amor
 Carita Pintada
 Luna salvaje
 Pobre Diabla
 Milagros
 Tres veces Sofía
 Carissima 
 Alma Rebelde
 Un nuevo amor
 Yo soy Betty, la fea
 Mi Destino Eres Tú
 Ecomoda
 La revancha
 La Mentira
 Por un beso
 Perla
 La duda
 Gata salvaje
 Ángel rebelde

Sport events 

 2024 IIHF World Championship
 2025 IIHF World Championship
 2026 IIHF World Championship
 2027 IIHF World Championship
 2028 IIHF World Championship
 UEFA Champions League

Quiz shows

News

Judge shows

Other programming
 Panelák - daily soap, very successful. Aired in prime time when it reaches 30% share. It was airing on TV Prima.
Starring: Diana Mórová, Mirka Partlová, Roman Luknár, Marián Miezga, Vladimir Kobielsky, Božidara Turzonovová, and others.
 Mafstory - Slovak sitcom about Mafian clan of Molnár family.
Starring: Roman Fratrič, Peter Batthyány, Peter Sklár, Ivan Macho, Martin Vanek, Gabriela Dzuríková, and others.
 Súdna Sieň - TV show about cases in camerae.
 Dr. Hermanová - TV show about psychological cases.
 Kutyil s.r.o. - TV show about Hungarian repairman living in Slovakia. In first season he has a TV show about repairing things. Series is a spin-off of sitcom Susedia.
Starring: Viki Ráková, Andy Kraus, and others
 Profesionáli - Slovak sitcom about stories on police office.
Starring: Peter Batthyány, Helena Krajčiová, Csongor Kassai, Janko Kroner

Notable television presenters 

 Dušan Ambróš (2022–present)
 Juraj Bača (2008)
 Erika Barkolová (2007–present)
 Lucia Barmošová (2005–present)
 Andrej Bičan (2003–2008)
 Pavel Bruchala (2014)
 Monika Bruteničová (2006–2021)
 Katarína Brychtová (2002–2004)
 Štefan Bučko (2002–2007)
 Bruno Ciberej (2009–present)
 Dušan Cinkota (2006)
 Dana Čapkovičová (2010–present)
 Marián Čekovský (2018–2019)
 Peter Čvirik (2021–present)
 Lenka Čviriková Hriadelová (2002–present)
 Matej "Sajfa" Cifra (2005–2006, 2008–2010, 2013)
 Daniel Dangl (2014)
 Martin Dejdar (2018–2019)
 Michal Dočolomanský (2004)
 Michal Farkašovský (2008–present)
 Marcel Forgáč (2015–present)
 Ján Gallovič (2004)
 Juraj Hajdin (2004–present)
 Zuzana Hajdu (2002–2006)
 Dárius Haraksin (2004–present)
 Michal Hazlinger (2008–present)
 Peter Hollý (2002–2013)
 Michal Hudák (2002–present)
 Ivan Janda (2008–present)
 Miriam Jarošová (2008–present)
 Katarína Jesenská (2016–present)
 Lenka Ježová (2022–present)
 Peter Jurčovič (2008–present)
 Slavomír Jurko (2021–present)
 Thomas Kamenar (2013–present)
 Ondrej Kandráč (2016–present)
 Adriana Kmotríková (2002–2020)
 Simona Krainová (2007)
 Jan Kraus (2006, 2010)
 Iveta Krupová (2010–present)
 Milan Kňažko (2003–2007)
 Peter Kočiš (2005–2008)
 Mário "Kuly" Kollár (2019–present)
 Stanislava Kováčik (2008–present)
 Jozef Kuriľák (2002–2004, 2018–present)
 Radovan Ležovič (2004–present)
 Janko Kroner (2003–2007)
 Ján Mečiar (2008–present)
 Pavol Michalka (2008–present)
 Soňa Müllerová (2005–2010)
 Martin Nikodým (2014–2015)
 Bibiana Ondrejková (2018–present)
 Branislav Ondruš (2002–2008)
 Aneta Parišková (2007–present)
 Stanislava Pavolová (2005–present)
 Andrea Pállfy Belányiová (2011–present)
 Petra Polnišová (2007)
 Jakub Prachař (2010–present)
 Jozef Pročko (2006–2007)
 Martin Rausch (2010–2013, 2020–present)
 Viliam Rozboril (2014–present)
 Richard Rybníček (2002–2003)
 Ľuboš Sarnovský (2002–present)
 Štefan Skrúcaný (2017–present)
 Alexander Štefuca (2004)
 Alfonz Šuran (2002–2003)
 Klaudia Suchomel Guzová (2002–2018)
 Dana Španková Roháčová (2002–2004)
 Adela Vinczeová (2009, 2012)
 Vladimír Voštinár (2002–present)
 Hana Zavřelová Gallová (2002–present)
 Milan Zimnýkoval (2012–present)

References

External links

Mass media in Slovakia
Television channels in Slovakia
Television channels and stations established in 2002